The Stetsons are an Australian country and western was band formed by members of GANGgajang, Mental As Anything and Flying Emus. They released a self-titled album in 1987 and played a few live shows, including at the Tamworth music Festival for the next two years. In 1997 the bands producer, Graham "Buzz" Bidstrup and his friend Andrew Richardson, made a record with former ABC JJJ  sound engineer Keith Walker in Jimmy Barnes old studio. The  album was called Their Most Successful Album...Ever. The band released 4 three singles with videos and the debut single "There's A Train In My Head"  was used in Crocodile Dundee II. Their music was also heard in the film Tenderhooks

Members

Chris Bailey (bass) – The Angels, GANGgajang, Jimmy Barnes Band, Dave Steel Band
Jeff "Skunk" Baxter (vocals) – Doobie Brothers
Kayellen Bee (vocals) – GANGgajang
Graham "Buzz" Bidstrup (drums, keyboards) – The Angels, The Party Boys, GANGgajang
Mark Callaghan (vocals) – GANGgajang, Riptides
Marilyn Delaney (vocals) – GANGgajang
Wayne Goodwin (fiddle) – Flying Emus, Dave Steel Band
Robert James (guitar) – GANGgajang, Wendy Matthews Band
Pixie Jenkins (fiddle) – John Williamson, Jimmy Barnes Band
Rick Melick (piano and hammond organ)
Mark Moffatt ( pedal steel, electric and acoustic guitar)
Reg Mombassa (guitar, vocals, keyboards) – Mental As Anything, Reg and Pete's Dog Trumpet
Peter O'Doherty (bass) – Mental As Anything, Reg and Pete's Dog Trumpet
Rose Pearse (vocals)
Martin Plaza (vocals, guitar) – Mental As Anything
Andrew Richardson (acoustic guitar)
Ian Simpson (banjo) – Flying Emus
Geoff Stapleton (keyboards, guitar) – GANGgajang, Rockmelons, Absent Friends, The Dukes, Aliens
Dave Steel (steel and slide guitar)

Discography

Albums
 The Stetsons – Mercury (1987)
 Their Most Successful Record... Ever – Larrikin (1997)

Singles
 "Train In My Head"/"Path Of Stone"/"Train In My Head" (instrumental) – Mercury (1987)
 "Bad Blood"/"Back To Tamworth" (instrumental)/"Train In My Head" (live) – Mercury (1987)

References

New South Wales musical groups
Musical groups established in 1987
Australian country music groups